The 1999 Northwestern Wildcats football team represented Northwestern University as a member of the Big Ten Conferenceduring the 1999 NCAA Division I-A football season. Led by first-year head coach Randy Walker, the Wildcats compiled an overall record of 3–8 with a mark of 1–7 in conference play, placing tenth in the Big Ten. Northwestern played home games at Ryan Field in Evanston, Illinois.

Schedule

Roster

Game summaries

Iowa

Team players in the NFL

References

Northwestern
Northwestern Wildcats football seasons
Northwestern Wildcats football